Charles Alexander Minlend, Jr. (born December 19, 1997) is an American-Cameroonian professional basketball player for Zornotza ST. He is the son of Charles Minlend, who played professionally as well.

Early life 
Minlend Jr. was born in Queens, New York, and grew up in four different countries as his father Charles played there professionally. He spent the first decade of his life in France, Israel and South Korea.

College career 
Minlend Jr. started out with San Francisco Dons, where he averaged 14.4 points and 4.7 rebounds over his three seasons there. He was named to the All-West Coast Conference Second Team twice, in 2019 and 2020.

Minlend Jr. then transferred to the Louisville Cardinals, after he also considered Arizona, Arkansas, Butler, Gonzaga, Indiana and Mississippi State. After redshirting his first season, he attained All-WCC Freshman Team honours in 2017–18.

Professional career 
In May 2022, Minlend Jr. joined Cameroonian club FAP for the playoffs of the Basketball Africa League. He scored a team-high 17 points in the lost third-place game.

In August 2022, he joined the Spanish club Zornotza ST for the 2022–23 season.

National team career 
In 2022, Minlend Jr. made his debut for the Cameroon men's national basketball team during the 2023 World Cup qualifiers.

Personal 
Charles' father Charles Minlend played collegiate for St. Johns before playing eleven seasons as a pro. His uncle, Raymond Minlend, played for the Davidson and St. Francis.

References

Cameroonian men's basketball players
American men's basketball players
San Francisco Dons men's basketball players
FAP Basketball players
Louisville Cardinals men's basketball players

1997 births

Living people